Gerard "Peque" Fernández Castellano (born 4 October 2002) is a Spanish professional footballer who plays as a forward for Racing Santander.

Club career
Born in L'Hospitalet de Llobregat, Barcelona, Catalonia, Fernández joined the youth setup of UE Cornellà in 2011. in 2014, he departed for FC Barcelona, however after two years he returned to Cornellà. Aged 16, Fernández made his senior debut for Cornellà in the Copa Federación de España and later in the Segunda División B. On 5 September 2019, Fernández returned to La Masia, signing a three-year contract, with an option for a further two. On 9 February 2020, Fernández was included in García Pimienta's squad for a match against Villarreal B. He scored on his Barcelona B debut, playing as a starter in the 3–2 loss at home.

On 7 July 2022, Fernández signed with newly promoted Segunda División side Racing de Santander on a two-year deal, following the expiration of his Barcelona contract.

International career
In February 2020, Fernández received a call up to Spain's under-18 team from Pablo Amo for a friendly against Denmark. He made his debut on 26 February as a starter in a 2–1 win.

References

External links

FC Barcelona profile

2002 births
Living people
Footballers from L'Hospitalet de Llobregat
Association football forwards
UE Cornellà players
FC Barcelona Atlètic players
Racing de Santander players
Segunda División B players
Primera Federación players
Segunda División players
Spain youth international footballers
Spanish footballers